2002 ballet premieres, List of
Lists of ballet premieres by year
Lists of 2000s ballet premieres
Ball